Diocese of Victoria may refer to:

Roman Catholic Diocese of Victoria in Canada, in Victoria, British Columbia
Roman Catholic Diocese of Victoria in Texas, in Victoria, Texas
The former Anglican Diocese of Victoria, Hong Kong, which had since been reorganised into the Hong Kong Sheng Kung Hui, an Anglican province
 the former Roman Catholic Diocese of Victoria in Australia (now Darwin)

See also
Province of Victoria, in Australia
 Roman Catholic Diocese of Port Victoria (Seychelles)